Norberto do Amaral (born 17 February 1956) is the Bishop of Diocese of Maliana, East Timor. After attending the elementary Catholic school in Ainaro, he entered the Seminary of Our Lady of Fatima in Dare. He completed his philosophical studies from 1981–1983 and theological studies between 1985–1988 at the Major Seminary of St. Peter in Ritapiret, Flores, Indonesia. He also carried out a year of pastoral ministry in the parish of Ossú during 1984. He was ordained a priest on 18 October 1988 for the Roman Catholic Diocese of Díli.

He subsequently served in the following positions: 1988: Assistant Pastor of the Parish of Ainaro, 1989–2000: Pastor of the Parish of Maubisse, 2000–2004: Rector of the Diocesan Minor Seminary in Dili.

In 2005–2007 he undertook studies for a licentiate in dogmatic theology at the Urban University in Rome. Since 2007 he has been Professor of Dogmatic Theology and Prefect of Studies at the Major Seminary in Dili. Since 2008, he has served as Chancellor of the Diocese of Dili and Director of the Diocesan Magazine “Seara”.

On 24 April 2010 he was consecrated bishop of the newly created Roman Catholic Diocese of Maliana.

In August 2015, Bishop do Amaral joined Archbishop Joseph Marino, the apostolic nuncio to Timor-Leste, Bishop Basilio do Nascimento of Baucau, and Archbishop Leopoldo Girelli, former nuncio to Timor-Leste and 8,000 faithful in celebrating 500 years of the Catholic Church's presence in East Timor. The main celebrant was Vatican Secretary of State Cardinal Pietro Parolin.

In June 2017, Bishop do Amaral blessed the new Kay Rala Xanana Gusmão International Airport in Suai. Present were President of East Timor Francisco Guterres, the Prime Minister of Timor-Leste, Rui Maria de Araújo, former President and Prime Minister Xanana Gusmão and many government and church leaders.

Bishop do Amaral joined the Apostolic Nuncio Archbishop Joseph Salvador Marino and Bishop Basilio do Nascimento of Baucau during the opening of the country's second minor seminary in his diocese on September 26, 2017. The new seminary will begin with 22 students.

In May 2020, Bishop do Amaral along with Archbishop Virgílio do Carmo da Silva and Bishop Basílio do Nascimento issued a statement officially reopening churches for Eucharistic celebrations after the Covid-19 lock-down.

References

1956 births
Living people
People from Ainaro District
21st-century Roman Catholic bishops in East Timor
Roman Catholic bishops of Maliana